"No Hook" is the second single released from Shaquille O'Neal's second album, Shaq Fu: Da Return. It featured verses from Wu-Tang Clan members, Method Man and RZA and was also produced by RZA.

The song found its greatest success on the Hot Rap Singles chart, peaking at #16.

Single track listing

A-Side
"No Hook" (Radio Version)- 3:16  
"No Hook" (Niles Flip DaScrip Mix)- 3:31  
"No Hook" (Waterbed Remix) 3:31

B-Side
"No Hook" (RZA's Remix)- 3:51  
"No Hook" (Niles Radio Remix)- 3:34  
"(So U Wanna Be) Hardcore"- 3:26

References

1994 songs
1995 singles
Method Man songs
Shaquille O'Neal songs
Songs written by Shaquille O'Neal
Jive Records singles
Songs written by RZA
Songs written by Method Man